Jerome Borges Schneewind (born May 17, 1930) is a Professor Emeritus of Philosophy at Johns Hopkins University.

Life
He received his B.A. from Cornell University and his M.A. and Ph.D. from Princeton University. Schneewind taught at the University of Chicago, Princeton, Yale University, the University of Pittsburgh (where he was also for several years Dean of the College of Arts and Sciences) and Hunter College CUNY where he was also Provost before coming to Hopkins as chair of the philosophy department in 1981. He has also taught at Leicester, Stanford, and Helsinki. He taught courses on the history of ethics, types of ethical theory, the British empiricists, Kant's ethics, and utopian thought.

He has held Mellon, Guggenheim, and NEH fellowships and spent 1992-1993 as a fellow at the Center for Advanced Study in Behavioral Sciences. He is a past president of the Eastern Division of the American Philosophical Association and a member of the American Academy of Arts and Sciences. He served as Chair of the American Philosophical Association's Board of Officers from  July 1999 to June 2002.

Works
Schneewind has edited several books, among them:

 Giving: Western Ideas of Philanthropy, Bloomington, Indiana University Press, 1996 (a collection of essays on philanthropy)
 Kant's Lectures on Ethics, Cambridge, Cambridge University Press, 2001, (in The Cambridge Edition of the Works of Immanuel Kant)
 Moral Philosophy from Montaigne to Kant, Cambridge, Cambridge University Press, 2003, (a two-volume collection of source material)

His own writings include, in addition to many articles, four books:

 Backgrounds of English Victorian Literature, Random House, 1970, is a very readable introduction to Victorian social and religious thought.
 Sidgwick's Ethics and Victorian Moral Philosophy, Oxford University Press, 1977
 The Invention of Autonomy, Cambridge University Press, 1998.
 Essays on the History of Moral Philosophy, Oxford University Press, 2009

References

1930 births
American philosophers
Cornell University alumni
Johns Hopkins University faculty
Academics of the University of Leicester
Living people